Porky Pig's Feat is a 1943 Warner Bros. Looney Tunes animated cartoon directed by Frank Tashlin. It was released on July 17, 1943, and stars Porky Pig and Daffy Duck.

Directed by Frank Tashlin with musical direction by Carl Stalling, and produced by Leon Schlesinger, the original release was black-and-white, though colorized versions were later produced.

Plot 
The cartoon centers around Porky Pig and Daffy Duck's attempts to escape the Broken Arms Hotel manager without paying their bill (on which they are charged for every luxury, including breathing air, sunshine, and goodwill); they are trying to evade payment because Daffy lost all their money playing craps.

Despite numerous methods to elude the hotel manager (using the elevator, throwing the manager down a large spiral staircase, knotting sheets and rappelling from a window, swinging from a window to a building across the street), he gets the upper hand every time and eventually locks them in a room, in shackles, where they will stay until they pay up. Winter arrives and Daffy is beginning to lose his sanity. Porky (who has written "Porky Loves Petunia" on the wall, and is keeping track of their incarceration with prison-style graffiti) says, "Gosh, if Bugs Bunny was only here." Daffy concurs and decides to call Bugs for advice, as the trickster is famous for being able to get out of seemingly inescapable situations. Once on the phone, Bugs asks Daffy if they have tried the various methods of escape which they did indeed try. Daffy replies "Yes" each time and adds, "We tried all those ways."  The door to the next room opens and Bugs is seen in shackles. He says, "Ahh, don't work, do they?"

Reception 
Animator Mark Mayerson writes, "Frank Tashlin had a very personal style of cartoon direction. He chose unusual camera angles and was never afraid to cut shots quickly for humorous effect. His characters were often posed in 'extreme' (exaggerated) positions, and these poses were held far longer than other directors would dare. Tashlin's direction is so flamboyant that it is as entertaining to watch as the characters. Porky Pig's Feat is fairly standard from a story standpoint, typical of Warner Bros. cartoons that pit characters against each other. It's how Tashlin tells this story that makes it so memorable."

Production 
The title is a play on words, referring to "pigs feet."

This was the first Schlesinger cartoon directed by Tashlin after his return to the studio following a five-year absence for stints at the Disney and Screen Gems studios. It is also the only appearance of Bugs Bunny, and final appearance of Porky Pig, in a black-and-white cartoon.

The cartoon was colorized in 1968 (just after Seven Arts Productions, successor to Guild Films, to whom the black-and-white cartoon library had been sold some time before, acquired Warner Bros.) by having every other frame traced over onto a cel. Each redrawn cel was painted in color and then photographed over a colored reproduction of each original background. The cartoon was colorized again in 1990, this time with a computer adding color to a new print of the original black and white cartoon.

Music 
Porky Pig's Feat contains the first use of the music "Powerhouse" in a cartoon. Composed by Raymond Scott, "Powerhouse" became iconic through its use in over forty Warner Bros. cartoons.  "Blues in the Night" is heard after Daffy loses the rent money gambling in the elevator. "The Penguin", another Scott composition, can also be heard when Porky and Daffy run to the elevator with their bags.

Home media
The cartoon is one of several from WB to have fallen into the public domain.

The cartoon appears on: 
 Looney Tunes Golden Collection, Volume 3
 Looney Tunes Platinum Collection: Volume 3 Blu-ray
 Porky Pig 101

References

External links 
 
 

1943 films
1943 animated films
1943 short films
1940s American animated films
1940s animated short films
Short films directed by Frank Tashlin
Looney Tunes shorts
American black-and-white films
Films set in hotels
Bugs Bunny films
Daffy Duck films
Porky Pig films
Films scored by Carl Stalling
Films produced by Leon Schlesinger